Gloria Alexandra is an American actress and model. Gloria Alexandra is known for playing Keifer Sutherland's girlfriend "Maria Lopez" in the action-thriller Desert Saints. She has also been featured in Car Craft Magazine and several other publications.

Early life and career
Gloria Alexandra was born and raised in Lima, Peru and relocated to the US, at 21. As a young child, she started taking ballet and piano. At age eight, she joined San Antonio Children's Theater and Choir. She loves all forms of art, loves performing, and also sings, dances and plays piano.

She has appeared in various independent films, including action thriller Desert Saints (opposite Kiefer Sutherland) and the drama A Beautiful Life

She starred in the made-for-TV movies Dog the Bounty Hunter. Her television work includes guest starring roles on Angel, Ally McBeal, The X Show, Jose Luis Sin Censura, Sin Tapujos, La Corte Familiar, as well as a series regular role on Secretos.  Gloria Alexandra has also appeared in Divorcio USA as the character of Lina Gallegos.
She recently completed the indy comedy Tweaksville released in 2010.

Advocacy
Gloria Alexandra is an advocate of all human rights and equality, specially women and children. She lives life by her quote: "Be Kind, Love Life, Believe in and Know your Dreams and Persevere."
She believes that we are all one, and that love and living from the heart is what matters, giving all religions their proper respect.

Filmography

References

External links
 
 
 
 Gloria Alexandra in A Beautiful Life
 Gloria Alexandra's Youtube Channel
 Official Gloria Alexandra on Monsters and Critics 

American television actresses
Living people
Peruvian emigrants to the United States
American film actresses
Year of birth missing (living people)
21st-century American women